Boucardicus ambindaensis is a species of land snail with an operculum, a terrestrial gastropod mollusc in the family Cyclophoridae. This species is endemic to Madagascar, occurs in Tsingy Beanka reserve, around 50 km east of Maintirano city.

Etymology 
From occurrence near Ambinda village.

Shell description 
Shell is pupilloid-like, almost smooth (with weak radial lines), aperture is almost round, with single columellar lamella relatively deep in aperture that goes through almost whole body-whorl inside it and single palatal lamella in the begging of body-whorl (could be visible through wall of shell). Basal peristome is almost complete, slightly reflected. Height of shell 2.4–2.5 mm, diameter 1.2–1.3 mm.

References

Boucardicus
Molluscs of Madagascar
Gastropods described in 2015
Endemic fauna of Madagascar